Commando 2: The Black Money Trail (or simply Commando 2) is a 2017 Indian Hindi-language action thriller film directed by Deven Bhojani and produced by Vipul Amrutlal Shah, Dhaval Jayantilal Gada and Reliance Entertainment. The film is a sequel to the 2013 film Commando: A One Man Army and the second installment of Commando film series. The principal photography of the film commenced on 17 February 2016. The film stars Vidyut Jammwal, Adah Sharma, Esha Gupta and Freddy Daruwala. 

The film was released on 3 March 2017. It was followed by a sequel titled Commando 3 which released in 2019. Commando 2 is also the only film in the series to be released along with its Tamil and Telugu dubbed versions.

Plot
Karanveer 'Karan' Singh Dogra, who is now skilled in many aspects of survival, weaponry, and hand-to-hand combat, is assigned on a mission to eradicate black money, which has been siphoned to banks along with his gang. Karan, along with Inspector Bhavana Reddy and ACP Bakhtawar Khan, heads to Vicky Chaddha's house, where he meets his wife Maria. The next day, a bomb blast occurres where Vicky and Maria are saved, but their daughter Tara dies. However, Maria kills her husband and tells that she is the actually Vicky Chaddha. A cat and mouse game ensues, where Karan, Bhavana and Bakhtawar follow Vicky and defeats her army including Vicky's main henchman K.P. Though Vicky transferred the money, Karan reveals to Vicky that he had changed the history in which the money was scheduled, and that the money has actually been transferred to a replaced account, which will help the poor farmers in India. He also tells that this was planned from the first day itself. After the revelation, Bhavana shoots Vicky, thus completing their mission. Later, Karan receives a phone call from his superiors and is assigned for another mission.

Cast
 Vidyut Jammwal as Commando Karanveer 'Karan' Singh Dogra, Bhavna's love interest
 Adah Sharma as Inspector Bhavna Reddy, Encounter Specialist
 Esha Gupta as Maria Chaddha (Fake) / Vicky Chaddha (Real)
 Freddy Daruwala as Bakhtawar Khan IPS, Assistant Commissioner of Police
 Shefali Shah as Leena Chowdhury, Minister of Home Affairs
 Kannan Arunachalam as Shrinath Iyer, Indian Embassy officer
 Thakur Anoop Singh as K.P., Vicky's henchman
 Adil Hussain as Aniruddh Roy, Karan's boss
 Suhail Nayyar as Dishank Chowdhury, Leena Chowdhury's son
 Vansh Bharadwaj as Vicky Chaddha 
 Satish Kaushik as Dhariwal Ranwal
 Ivan Rodrigues as Kamath
 Siddharth Kher as Jimmy Kher
 Avisha Sharma as Tara
 Sumit Gulati as Zafar Hussain, the hacktivist
 Prince Rodde as 'Whisperer'
 Jeet Raidutt as Vinay

Soundtrack

The songs of the film have been composed by Mannan Shaah and Gourov Roshin, while the lyrics have been penned by Aatish Kapadia and Kumaar. The background score has been composed by Prasad Sashte. The soundtrack was released on 13 February 2017 by T-Series. The song "Hare Krishna Hare Ram" is a recreated version of the title track of the 2007 film Bhool Bhulaiyaa starring Akshay Kumar, which was originally composed by Pritam and lyrics written by Sameer. The music for this song was recreated by Gourov-Roshin with lyrics written by Kumaar.

Accolades
Franz Spilhaus has been nominated for Filmfare Award for Best Action for this film.

Sequel
A sequel named Commando 3 was released on 29 November 2019, featuring Vidyut Jammwal, Adah Sharma, Angira Dhar and Gulshan Devaiah in lead roles.

References

External links

 
 

2017 films
2010s Hindi-language films
Indian action thriller films
Films scored by Mannan Shaah
Films scored by Gourov Roshin
Films about the Research and Analysis Wing
Indian sequel films
Films with screenplays by Ritesh Shah
Reliance Entertainment films
Indian martial arts films
2017 martial arts films
2017 action thriller films